Afghanistan competed at the 2019 World Athletics Championships in Doha, Qatar, from 27 September to 6 October 2019. Said Gilani was the only athlete representing Afghanistan for the second consecutive championships, in the men's 100 metres event.

Results

Men 
Track and road events

References

Afghanistan IAAF World Athletics Championships, DOHA 2019. IAAF. Retrieved 2019-09-27.

Nations at the 2019 World Athletics Championships
World Championships in Athletics
2019